Ancylosis platynephes is a species of snout moth in the genus Ancylosis. It was described by Joseph de Joannis in 1927 and is known from Mozambique.

References

Endemic fauna of Mozambique
platynephes
Lepidoptera of Mozambique
Moths of Sub-Saharan Africa
Moths described in 1927